Cheryl Waters (born January 18, 1947) is an American film and television actress.  Her most famous role was the female lead in the 1974 film, Macon County Line.

Career

1970s
One of her earliest film appearances was in the 1971 biker film, Ride the Hot Wind, which starred Tommy Kirk, Duke Kelly, and Sherry Bain. After that she played the part of Bonnie, a young woman having an affair with Robert Matthews, her psychology professor in Don Jones' 1971 exploitation film, Schoolgirls in Chains. She played the female lead in Richard Compton's 1974 film, Macon County Line. Her character, the attractive Jenny Scott is making her way to Dallas and is picked up by good-time seeking brothers Chris and Wayne Dixon (played by Alan and Jesse Vint) who are making their way south-by-southwest. Their fun times eventually comes to an end when they eventually find trouble. In 1978, Kevin Image of Death was released, in which Waters played the part of Barbara Shields. Cathey Paine, Tony Bonner and Penne Hackforth-Jones also starred in the film.

1980s to 1990s
She played the part of Lorraine Webster in the Real Mothers episode of The Trials of Rosie O'Neill which aired in September 1991.

Filmography

References

External links
 
 

American television actresses
American film actresses
Living people
1947 births
21st-century American women